Sobralia altissima (Common name Inquil) is a species of orchid endemic to Huancavelica Department, Peru. It holds the record for tallest cane-like (ie non-vining) orchid species, with stems up to 13.4 m (44 feet) tall. with the self-supporting canes not over two inches (five centimeters) thick. This is the most tree-like orchid to be discovered to date. The six-inch (fifteen centimeter) wide purple flowers have white tips on their petals. The species was discovered in 1999 by Benjamin Collantes and Marco Leon.

References 

altissima
Flora of Peru

Terrestrial orchids